Damien Escobar (born 1986), also known as Dame Esco, is an American violinist. He was previously in the duo Nuttin' But Stringz with his brother Tourie, but has been a solo artist since 2012. His "crossover violin" musical style consists of a mix of classical, jazz, pop, R&B, and hip hop.

Early life and education
Escobar was born in 1986 in the Jamaica, Queens neighborhood in New York City. He lived with his single mother and older brother Tourie. He began playing the violin at the age of eight. At the age of ten, Escobar became the youngest student accepted into the Juilliard School of Music. He graduated from Juilliard at 13. He also studied at the Bloomingdale School of Music.

Career
As kids, Damien and Tourie worked as street musicians, playing at Grand Central Station and on the New York City subways. In 2003, they began playing professionally under the name Nuttin' But Stringz. In 2005, Nuttin' But Stringz won a talent contest at the Apollo Theater. In 2006, Escobar appeared in the film Step Up. Nuttin' But Stringz took third place in the 2008 season of America's Got Talent. They performed at the First inauguration of Barack Obama in 2009 and won two Emmys. In 2012, Nuttin' But Stringz separated. Escobar returned to school and got his real estate license.

After a short career as a real estate broker, Escobar returned to music as a solo act. His first solo performance was on the French TV show Taratata. He also played at the Indy Car 2012 Championship Awards Banquet, Russell Simmon's Hip Hop Inaugural Ball and the 2013 Food & Wine event in New York City. In 2013, Escobar went on the I Am Me tour in order to promote his comeback. He released his first solo album "Sensual Melodies" in 2014.

In 2014, he authored an autobiographical children's book titled "The Sound of Strings." The same year he performed at Oprah's "The Life You Want" weekend tour. Escobar released his first pop single "Freedom" in September 2015, which premiered at #15 on the iTunes chart.

He released his second solo album, Boundless, in 2017, which was nominated for the 49th NAACP Image Awards in 2018 for the Outstanding Jazz Album category. The album includes eleven songs. Then, after a year's break, he released another solo album, Songs from a Breakthrough, followed by 25 Days of Christmas in 2020.

Escobar started the "Life Out Loud" tour in 2022, which he performed across the United States. The theme of the tour was to encourage the audience to live a real life without regrets. As of 2022, he is working on his upcoming album, which he will release in 2023.

Discography

Philanthropy
In 2007, Escobar founded the Violins Against Violence foundation. Escobar also works with the VH1 Save the Music Foundation, UNICEF and Kennedy’s Cause, a charity that benefits children with lymphatic malformation. He is also on the Board of Directors for the Jamaica YMCA. In 2013, he hosted an event that raised over $50,000 for the Jamaica YMCA. In 2014, Escobar performed a rendition of We Shall Overcome in honor of Mike Brown, Trayvon Martin and his friend Sean Bell.

References

External links
Official site

Living people
1986 births
People from Jamaica, Queens
American male violinists
Hip hop violinists
America's Got Talent contestants
21st-century American violinists
21st-century American male musicians